The 1959 Louisville Cardinals football team was an American football team that represented the University of Louisville as an independent during the 1959 NCAA College Division football season. In their 14th season under head coach Frank Camp, the Cardinals compiled a 6–4 record.

The team's statistical leaders included Ernie Green with 510 rushing yards.

Schedule

References

Louisville
Louisville Cardinals football seasons
Louisville Cardinals football